Michael Linzer and Gerald Melzer were the defending champions, having won the event in 2012, but both players chose not to defend their title.

Henri Kontinen and Goran Tošić won the title, defeating Ruben Gonzales and Chris Letcher in the final, 6–4, 6–4.

Seeds

Draw

Draw

References 
 Draw

Tampere Open - Men's Doubles
2013 Men's Doubles